Alguashte is a seasoning typical of Salvadoran cuisine made from ground pepitas (pumpkin seeds), and is used on both sweet or savoury meals. Simple to make; it is often prepared at home, however it can also be purchased pre-packaged as well as from street vendors often as an addition to a meal or snack. It is added to fruits such as unripe mango, as well as food dishes such as shuco and chicken.

Etymology 
Alhuashte: from the Nahuatl AYU, juice; JUASHTI, seeds. Adobo prepared from pumpkin seeds.

History 

While its origin is not known, alguashte likely is of Mayan origins as pepitas have been consumed in Mesoamerica for several centuries.

Notes 

Salvadoran cuisine
Condiments